Hans-Günther Wauer (12 December 1925 – 17 February 2016) was a German church musician, winner of the 1985 Handel Prize.

References

External links 
 
 

Cathedral organists
Organ improvisers
German jazz organists
Officers Crosses of the Order of Merit of the Federal Republic of Germany
Handel Prize winners
1925 births
2016 deaths
20th-century classical musicians